This is a list of programs previously aired by RJTV. For the current shows on RJTV of this network, see List of programs broadcast by RJTV.

Local defunct shows

News programs
 Newsline Citybeat
 Newsline Consumers Front
 RJTV Interactive News with Tony Israel.
 RJ TeleRadio (2019)
 Insider Exclusive Kapihan (2018-2020; simulcast on DZRJ 810 AM)

Public service
 Doc Willie and Liza
 HealthLine with Makati Med (2018-2019; simulcast on DZRJ 810 AM)
 Heartbeat Philippines
 Interactive Health
 On Scene: Emergency Response

Current affairs
 Insight
 Legally Speaking
 Open House with Gerry Cornejo
 Pag-usapan Natin
 Rapido sa RJTV
 Unbiased (2018-2019)

Talk shows
 Hearts on Fire Jorel Of All Trades Talk to Harry (now on Global News Network)
 sportZtackle (hosted by sportscaster Noel Zarate)

Travel shows
 Only GemmaVariety shows
 Acoustic Show with Paul Toledo Alternatives Bistromania (1993-1994)
 Catch a Rising Star Dance Upon A Time with Becky Garcia (1993-1997)
 Executive Lounge with Dale Adriatrico (2006-2007)
 Gimme a Break! (2006-2007)
 Hapi Our (2006-2007)
 Intimate Sessions with Charlie Ysmael (1995)
 Itchy Feet (2019)
 La Salle Night on a Blue Monday (2019)
 Live by Request Livewire Local Jam New Generation Party Central Pinoy Arts Exposed RJ Penthouse (2002-2004)
 Saturday Night Live with Jorel Tan Seasons On-Stage Wednesday Underground A Wonderful Evening with Arthur ManuntagCelebrity talk shows
 All The Way Show (previously aired on QTV, TV5, GMA Network & now on PTV as Medyo Late Night Show with Jojo A. All The Way, 2018)
 All The Way With Jojo A. The Bill Bailey Show The Lynn Sherman Show Medyo Late Night Show with Jojo A. All The Way (previously aired on QTV, TV5, GMA Network & now on PTV as of 2018)

Youth-oriented shows
 Blazin' RnB (2003)
 Kaibigan  (2007)
 Livewire (1993)
 Local Jam (1993-1995)
 Saturday Night Live with Jorel Tan (2007)
 Wednesday Underground (2007)

Showbiz oriented
 Look Who's Talking with Chito AlcidReligious shows
 Ang Dating Daan (1994-1998, now aired on UNTV 37: 2004–present)
 Armor of God (2001-2004)
 The Chaplet Of The Divine Mercy (1993–2007)
 Oras ng Katotohanan (2001–2007)

Reality shows
 New Generation (2005-2007)
 Two Stops Over With Paco Guerrero1 (2010-2012)

Lifestyle shows
 Body and Face by Mendez For Sharing Home Buddies In Her Shoes1
 Slice of Life with Melissa Gecolea1
 Suzy's Cue with Suzy Guttler (2005)
 You've Been Served with Chef Red1
 Privilege Card (2019)

Drama
 Sta. Zita At Si Mary Rose (1989; moved to ABS-CBN, 1989-1992)

Kids' programs
 Junior Jam Kiddeo Kiddie News Worlds of Fun TV Game ShowSports
 Pinoy Wrestling (1993-2002)
 Pinoy Wrestling Reloaded (2002-2003)
 Sportzblitz SportztackleGame shows
 Spin 2 Win (2006-2008)

Infomercials
 EZ Shop Home TV Shopping (1993-1997)
 Shop TV (2009-2018)
 New Life Shopping TV Value Vision The Quantum Channel Winner TV ShoppingMovie blocks
 3rd Row1 (2008-2011)
 Classic Comedy Movies (2021-2022)
 Pinoy Box Office (2006-2007)
 The Screening Room1 (2011-2018)
 Sunday Night Movies Xclusive Cinema SpecialSpecials
 An Atenean Tribute: RJ Bistro's 12th Anniversary Special (July 1998)
 RJ Jams at Glorietta (1997)
 RJ Junior Jam Finals Radyo Bandido Strikes Again (1997)
 RJTV 29 Lenten Special: Awit Papuri Sa Panginoon (April 1995)
 RJ Junior Jam New Year Special (December 30, 1995)
 Papuri: The Tiples De Sto. Domingo Christmas Concert TV Special (December 9, 2019)
 Celebreast: The Fight Against Cancer (May 27, 2019)
 2000 Today (December 31, 1999-January 1,2000)
 34th Bistro RJ Anniversary (TV Special) (July 25, 2020)
 Bibingka, Puto Bumbong, Musika, Atbp.: The RJTV 29 Christmas Special (December 23, 1994)
 RJ Birthday Marathon Jam TV Special (June 5–6, 2020)
 RJ Bistro Christmas Treat (December 23, 2022)
 2 Shows Back-to-Back Concert Series at RJ Bistro
 Elvis Night & Disco Dancing: Valentine's Show (February 14, 2022)
 Tribute Night & Twist Night (March 25, 2022)
 Elvis vs. Sinatra & Dancing All-Night (April 29, 2022)
 Dance Fest: RJ's 77th Birthday & Retro Dancing (June 3, 2022)
 Pavarotti Duets & Dancing All-Night: RJ Bistro's 36th Anniversary (July 25, 2022)
 Elvis Night & Dancing All-Night (August 17, 2022)
 Night of the Singing Generals & Dancing All-Night (September 30, 2022)
 Night of the Singing Ex-Cabinets Members & Dancing All-Night (November 9, 2022)
 Concert King Meets Rock 'N Roll King (November 29, 2022)
 Elvis Night: Celebrating Elvis Presley's 88th Birthday & Dancing All-Night (January 18, 2023)

Previously aired programs

 30 Days1
 Ally McBeal1
 America's Got Talent1
 America's Next Great Restaurant1
 Anything For A Laugh Are You There, Chelsea?1
 Back in the Game1
 Back to You1
 Better with You1
 Bewitched Big Shots1
 The Biggest Loser1
 The Biggest Loser UK Edition1
 Blow Out1
 Bono Boston Legal1
 Box Office America Business in a Box Californication1
 Case 2 Case Celebrity Cooking Showdown1
 Celebrity Says!1
 Classic Rock Coach Cold Turkey1
 The Crazy Ones1
 Crowded1
 Dateline NBC1
 Deal or No Deal USA1
 Denise Austin's Daily Workout Dharma & Greg1
 Diff'rent Strokes Dinner: Impossible1
 Dinosaucers The Directors1
 Doogie Howser, M.D.1
 Double Exposure1
 Dr. 902101
 Dr. Phil1
 Dress My Nest1
 Early Today1
 ER1
 Extreme Makeover: Home Edition1
 Extant1
 The Facts of Life Fairy Tales Stories Fantastic Four Farmer Wants a Wife1
 Father Knows Best The Funky Phantom Golf in Paradise Good Morning! How Are You? Growing Up Fisher1 (2014)
 Hell's Kitchen1
 Hollywood 1011
 Hot Shots1
 Hot Stuff House1
 I Hate My Teenage Daughter1
 I Propose1
 In Plain Sight1
 Inside the Actors Studio1
 Inside Edition1
 The Insider Italy Unpacked1
 Jamie's 30 Minute Meals1
 Jeopardy!1
 The Jerry Springer Show1
 Josie and the Pussycats Josie and The Pussy Cats in Outer Space Kath & Kim1
 Kimora: Life in the Fab Lane1
 Kitchen Nightmares1
 Kristie's Fill Your House for Free (2015)
 The Layover1
 The L Word1
 Life Choices Lipstick Jungle1
 Live from Abbey Road1
 Living Coffee1
 The Lonely Chef Love Bites1
 Lovespring International1
 Mad Men1
 Malcolm in the Middle1
 The Man Called U.N.C.L.E. Marcel's Quantum Kitchen1
 Married1
 Married... with Children Maury1
 May The Best House Win Canada1
 May the Best House Win US1
 Men in Trees1
 The Mentalist1
 Mercy1
 Million Dollar Listing1
 Mister T Mixing With The Best1
 The Moment of Truth1
 Nanny 9111
 The Naughty Kitchen with Chef Blythe Beck1
 NBC Nightly News1
 The New Adventures of Old Christine1
 Nip/Tuck1
 Notes from the Underbelly1
 Oh Tokyo! Odd Mom Out1♥
 The Oprah Winfrey Show1
 Outsourced1
 The Price Is Right1
 Pushing Daisies1
 R.A.I.D. The Real Housewives of Atlanta1
 The Real Housewives of New York City1
 The Real Housewives of Orange County1
 Reservations Required1
 The Riches1
 Rita Rocks1
 Royal Pains1
 Satisfaction1
 Saved1
 Saving Grace1
 Sealab 2020 Sean Saves the World1 (2014)
 Sex and the City1
 Shazzan Showbiz Moms & Dads1
 Side Order of Life1
 Silent Majority1
 Six Feet Under1
 Skating with Celebrities1
 Slot Machine Small Wonder1
 Soap Stargazer The Starter Wife1
 Starting Over1
 Still Standing1
 The Streets of San Francisco Studio 60 on the Sunset Strip1
 Summerland1
 Super Sports Follies Tabloid Wars1
 Tease1
 Thintervention with Jackie Warner1
 Three's Company Ticket to Adventure The Today Show1
 Top Chef1
 Top Chef Masters1
 Tori & Dean: Inn Love1
 Trading Spouses1
 Trust Me1
 Unan1mous1
 Under Cover Video Fashion Wacky Races Wait Till Your Father Gets Home The Wall Street Journal Report with Maria Bartiromo1
 The Wedding Band1 
 The West Wing1
 What Would You Do? Wheel of Fortune1
 Windfall1
 The Wonder Years''1

♥ Now moved to ETC ● Now moved to Jack TV1 Acquired through the blocktime agreement with 2nd Avenue

See also
DZRJ-DTV
2nd Avenue
List of programs broadcast by RJTV
Rajah Broadcasting Network
Solar Entertainment Corporation

RJTV
RJTV